Bis-tris methane, also known as BIS-TRIS or BTM, is a buffering agent used in biochemistry.  Bis-tris methane is an organic tertiary amine with labile protons having a pKa of 6.46 at 25 °C. It is an effective buffer between the pH 5.8 and 7.2. Bis-tris methane binds strongly to Cu and Pb ions as well as, weakly, to Mg, Ca, Mn, Co, Ni, Zn and Cd.

See also
Bis-tris propane
Tris
Tricine

References

Polyols
Amines
Buffer solutions